Below is a sequence of some of the events that affected the history of the city of İzmir (historically also Smyrna).

Timeline

See also
 Timelines of other cities in Turkey: Ankara, Bursa, Istanbul

Sources

Footnotes

Further reading

Published in the 19th century
 
 

Published in the 20th century
 

 
izmir